The 1981 Dartmouth Big Green football team was an American football team that represented Dartmouth College during the 1981 NCAA Division I-A football season. Dartmouth tied for third place in the Ivy League.

In their fourth season under head coach Joe Yukica, the Big Green compiled a 6–4 record and outscored opponents 208 to 137. Kent Cooper and George Thompson were the team captains.

The Big Green's 6–1 conference record tied Yale for the Ivy League championship. Dartmouth outscored Ivy opponents 193 to 87. Dartmouth's sole league loss was to its co-champion, Yale. 

This was the Big Green's last season in the NCAA's top level of football competition. Shortly after the season ended, the NCAA reassigned all of the Ivy League teams to the second-tier Division I-AA, which would later be renamed the Football Championship Subdivision.

Dartmouth played its home games at Memorial Field on the college campus in Hanover, New Hampshire.

Schedule

References

Dartmouth
Dartmouth Big Green football seasons
Ivy League football champion seasons
Dartmouth Big Green football